The 2009 World Interuniversity Games were the 11th edition of the Games (organised by IFIUS, and took place in Milan, Italy, from October 12 to October 16, 2009.

Hosting
After 5 years, the Games were once again held in Italy. After Rome 2003, Milan in the Lombardy region hosted the 2009 Games. The Università Cattolica del Sacro Cuore acted as the host university.

Competitions
Teams participated in 8 different competitions (5 sports). For the first time a Golf and Pitch&Putt competition was held.

 Football Men
 Football Women
 Futsal Men
 Basketball Men
 Basketball Women
 Volleyball Men
 Volleyball Women
 Golf and Pitch&Putt

Football Men

Results of the Final Round:

Football Women

Results of the Final Round:

Final standings

Football Men

Football Women

Futsal Men

Basketball Men

Basketball Women

Volleyball Men

Volleyball Women

Golf and Pitch & Putt

External links
 IFIUS Milan 2009

2009 in multi-sport events
2009 in Italian sport
2009
International sports competitions hosted by Italy
Multi-sport events in Italy
Sports competitions in Milan
October 2009 sports events in Europe
2009 World Interuniversity Games